The Pier 8 is a 49-floor tower in the inner Dubai Marina in Dubai, United Arab Emirates. The tower has a total height of 200 m (656 ft). The architectural consultant was WS Atkins & Partners and later replaced by DXB Design Studio. Construction of the Pier 8 tower is expected to be completed by 2024.

See also 
 List of tallest buildings in Dubai

External links
propsearch
Emporis

Proposed skyscrapers in Dubai
Buildings and structures under construction in Dubai